Barzia (also transliterated as Burzia, Barziya, Burziya or Bŭrziya) is a village (село) in northwestern Bulgaria, located in the Berkovitsa Municipality of the Montana Province.

Honours
Barziya Peak on Loubet Coast, Antarctica is named after the village.

References

Villages in Montana Province